Erika Vilūnaitė (born 25 December 1980) is a road cyclist from Lithuania. She represented her nation at the 1998 and 2005 UCI Road World Championships.

References

External links
 profile at Procyclingstats.com

1980 births
Lithuanian female cyclists
Living people
People from Utena